In Person with Maureen O'Boyle (or simply In Person) is an American daytime talk show that was hosted by Maureen O'Boyle that ran in syndication from September 9, 1996 to May 21, 1997. The show was produced by Telepictures Productions and is distributed by Warner Bros. Domestic Television Distribution, and after its cancellation, she went on to be a correspondent of Extra.

References

External links
 

1996 American television series debuts
1997 American television series endings
1990s American television talk shows
First-run syndicated television programs in the United States
Television series by Warner Bros. Television Studios
Television series by Telepictures